This page lists all described genera and species of the spider family Anyphaenidae. , the World Spider Catalog accepts 685 species in 56 genera:

A

Acanthoceto
Acanthoceto Mello-Leitão, 1944
 Acanthoceto acupicta (Nicolet, 1849) (type) — Chile, Argentina, Uruguay, Brazil
 Acanthoceto cinerea (Tullgren, 1901) — Chile, Argentina
 Acanthoceto ladormida Ramírez, 1997 — Chile
 Acanthoceto marina Ramírez, 1997 — Chile
 Acanthoceto pichi Ramírez, 1997 — Chile, Argentina
 Acanthoceto riogrande Ramírez, 1997 — Brazil, Argentina
 Acanthoceto septentrionalis (Berland, 1913) — Colombia, Ecuador

Aljassa
Aljassa Brescovit, 1997
 Aljassa annulipes (Caporiacco, 1955) (type) — Venezuela
 Aljassa notata (Keyserling, 1881) — Peru
 Aljassa poicila (Chamberlin, 1916) — Peru
 Aljassa subpallida (L. Koch, 1866) — Colombia
 Aljassa venezuelica (Caporiacco, 1955) — Venezuela

Amaurobioides
Amaurobioides O. Pickard-Cambridge, 1883
 Amaurobioides africana Hewitt, 1917 — Namibia, South Africa
 Amaurobioides chilensis (Nicolet, 1849) — Chile
 Amaurobioides isolata Hirst, 1993 — Australia (South Australia)
 Amaurobioides litoralis Hickman, 1949 — Australia (Tasmania)
 Amaurobioides major Forster, 1970 — New Zealand
 Amaurobioides maritima O. Pickard-Cambridge, 1883 (type) — New Zealand
 Amaurobioides minor Forster, 1970 — New Zealand
 Amaurobioides pallida Forster, 1970 — New Zealand
 Amaurobioides picuna Forster, 1970 — New Zealand
 Amaurobioides piscator Hogg, 1909 — New Zealand (Auckland Is., Campbell Is.)
 Amaurobioides pleta Forster, 1970 — New Zealand
 Amaurobioides pohara Forster, 1970 — New Zealand

Anyphaena

Anyphaena Sundevall, 1833
 Anyphaena accentuata (Walckenaer, 1802) (type) — Europe to Central Asia, Iran
 Anyphaena alachua Platnick, 1974 — USA
 Anyphaena alamos Platnick & Lau, 1975 — Mexico
 Anyphaena alboirrorata Simon, 1878 — Portugal, Spain, France
 Anyphaena andina Chamberlin, 1916 — Peru
 Anyphaena aperta (Banks, 1921) — USA, Canada
 Anyphaena arbida Platnick, 1974 — USA
 Anyphaena autumna Platnick, 1974 — USA
 Anyphaena ayshides Yaginuma, 1958 — Japan
 Anyphaena bermudensis Sierwald, 1988 — Bermuda
 Anyphaena bispinosa Bryant, 1940 — Cuba
 Anyphaena bromelicola Platnick, 1977 — Mexico
 Anyphaena bryantae Roewer, 1951 — Cuba
 Anyphaena californica (Banks, 1904) — USA
 Anyphaena catalina Platnick, 1974 — USA, Mexico
 Anyphaena celer (Hentz, 1847) — USA, Canada
 Anyphaena cielo Platnick & Lau, 1975 — Mexico
 Anyphaena cochise Platnick, 1974 — USA
 Anyphaena cortes Platnick & Lau, 1975 — Mexico
 Anyphaena crebrispina Chamberlin, 1919 — USA
 Anyphaena cumbre Platnick & Lau, 1975 — Mexico
 Anyphaena darlingtoni Bryant, 1940 — Cuba
 Anyphaena decora Bryant, 1942 — Puerto Rico
 Anyphaena diversa Bryant, 1936 — Cuba
 Anyphaena dixiana (Chamberlin & Woodbury, 1929) — USA
 Anyphaena dominicana Roewer, 1951 — Hispaniola
 Anyphaena encino Platnick & Lau, 1975 — Mexico
 Anyphaena felipe Platnick & Lau, 1975 — Mexico
 Anyphaena fraterna (Banks, 1896) — USA
 Anyphaena furcatella Banks, 1914 — Costa Rica
 Anyphaena furva Miller, 1967 — France, Germany, Czech Rep., Slovakia
 Anyphaena gertschi Platnick, 1974 — USA
 Anyphaena gibba O. Pickard-Cambridge, 1896 — Mexico
 Anyphaena gibboides Platnick, 1974 — USA
 Anyphaena gibbosa O. Pickard-Cambridge, 1896 — Mexico
 Anyphaena grovyle Lin & Li, 2021 — China (Hainan)
 Anyphaena hespar Platnick, 1974 — USA, Mexico
 Anyphaena inferens Chamberlin, 1925 — Costa Rica, Panama
 Anyphaena judicata O. Pickard-Cambridge, 1896 — USA to Guatemala
 Anyphaena kurilensis Peelle & Saito, 1932 — Russia (Kurile Is.)
 Anyphaena lacka Platnick, 1974 — USA
 Anyphaena leechi Platnick, 1977 — Mexico
 Anyphaena maculata (Banks, 1896) — USA
 Anyphaena marginalis (Banks, 1901) — USA, Mexico
 Anyphaena modesta Bryant, 1948 — Hispaniola
 Anyphaena mogan Song & Chen, 1987 — China
 Anyphaena mollicoma Keyserling, 1879 — Colombia
 Anyphaena morelia Platnick & Lau, 1975 — Mexico
 Anyphaena nexuosa Chickering, 1940 — Panama
 Anyphaena numida Simon, 1897 — Algeria, Portugal, Spain, France, Britain
 Anyphaena obregon Platnick & Lau, 1975 — Mexico
 Anyphaena otinapa Platnick & Lau, 1975 — Mexico
 Anyphaena pacifica (Banks, 1896) — USA, Canada
 Anyphaena pectorosa L. Koch, 1866 — USA, Canada
 Anyphaena plana F. O. Pickard-Cambridge, 1900 — Panama
 Anyphaena pontica Weiss, 1988 — Romania, Turkey
 Anyphaena pretiosa Banks, 1914 — Costa Rica
 Anyphaena proba O. Pickard-Cambridge, 1896 — Mexico
 Anyphaena pugil Karsch, 1879 — Russia (Sakhalin, Kurile Is.), Korea, Japan
 Anyphaena pusilla Bryant, 1948 — Hispaniola
 Anyphaena quadricornuta Kraus, 1955 — El Salvador
 Anyphaena rhynchophysa Feng, Ma & Yang, 2012 — China
 Anyphaena rita Platnick, 1974 — USA, Mexico
 Anyphaena sabina L. Koch, 1866 — Europe, Turkey, Caucasus
 Anyphaena salto Platnick & Lau, 1975 — Mexico
 Anyphaena sceptile Lin & Li, 2021 — China (Hainan)
 Anyphaena scopulata F. O. Pickard-Cambridge, 1900 — Guatemala
 Anyphaena shenzhen Lin & Li, 2021 — China
 Anyphaena simoni Becker, 1878 — Mexico
 Anyphaena simplex O. Pickard-Cambridge, 1894 — Mexico, Costa Rica
 Anyphaena soricina Simon, 1889 — India
 Anyphaena subgibba O. Pickard-Cambridge, 1896 — Guatemala
 Anyphaena syriaca Kulczyński, 1911 — Lebanon, Israel
 Anyphaena taiwanensis Chen & Huang, 2011 — Taiwan
 Anyphaena tancitaro Platnick & Lau, 1975 — Mexico
 Anyphaena tehuacan Platnick & Lau, 1975 — Mexico
 Anyphaena tibet Lin & Li, 2021 — China
 Anyphaena trifida F. O. Pickard-Cambridge, 1900 — Mexico, Guatemala
 Anyphaena tuberosa F. O. Pickard-Cambridge, 1900 — Guatemala
 Anyphaena wanlessi Platnick & Lau, 1975 — Mexico
 Anyphaena wuyi Zhang, Zhu & Song, 2005 — China, Taiwan
 Anyphaena xochimilco Platnick & Lau, 1975 — Mexico
 Anyphaena yoshitakei Baba & Tanikawa, 2017 — Japan
 Anyphaena zorynae Durán-Barrón, Pérez & Brescovit, 2016 — Mexico
 Anyphaena zuyelenae Durán-Barrón, Pérez & Brescovit, 2016 — Mexico

Anyphaenoides
Anyphaenoides Berland, 1913
 Anyphaenoides brescoviti Baert, 1995 — Peru
 Anyphaenoides caribensis Martínez, Brescovit & Martinez, 2018 — Colombia
 Anyphaenoides clavipes (Mello-Leitão, 1922) — Brazil, Argentina
 Anyphaenoides cocos Baert, 1995 — Costa Rica (Cocos Is.)
 Anyphaenoides coddingtoni Brescovit, 1998 — Brazil, Bolivia
 Anyphaenoides enigmatica Martínez, Brescovit & Martinez, 2018 — Colombia
 Anyphaenoides foreroi Martínez, Brescovit & Martinez, 2018 — Colombia
 Anyphaenoides hilli Martínez, Brescovit & Martinez, 2018 — Colombia
 Anyphaenoides irusa Brescovit, 1992 — Venezuela, Suriname, Leeward Antilles
 Anyphaenoides katiae Baert, 1995 — Ecuador (Galapagos Is.)
 Anyphaenoides locksae Brescovit & Ramos, 2003 — Brazil
 Anyphaenoides octodentata (Schmidt, 1971) — Venezuela, Ecuador, Peru, Galapagos Is.
 Anyphaenoides pacifica (Banks, 1902) — Trinidad to Chile, Galapagos Is.
 Anyphaenoides placens (O. Pickard-Cambridge, 1896) — Panama, Venezuela
 Anyphaenoides pluridentata Berland, 1913 (type) — Ecuador
 Anyphaenoides samiria Brescovit, 1998 — Peru
 Anyphaenoides sialha Brescovit, 1992 — Peru
 Anyphaenoides sierraensis Martínez, Brescovit & Martinez, 2018 — Colombia
 Anyphaenoides volcan Brescovit, 1998 — Panama
 Anyphaenoides xiboreninho Brescovit, 1998 — Brazil

Arachosia
Arachosia O. Pickard-Cambridge, 1882
 Arachosia albiventris Mello-Leitão, 1922 — Brazil, Argentina
 Arachosia anyphaenoides O. Pickard-Cambridge, 1882 (type) — Brazil
 Arachosia arachosia Mello-Leitão, 1922 — Venezuela, Brazil
 Arachosia avalosi Rubio & Ramírez, 2015 — Brazil, Argentina
 Arachosia bergi (Simon, 1880) — Brazil, Uruguay, Argentina
 Arachosia bifasciata (Mello-Leitão, 1922) — Brazil, Argentina
 Arachosia carancho Rubio & Ramírez, 2015 — Argentina
 Arachosia cubana (Banks, 1909) — USA, Cuba
 Arachosia freiburgensis Keyserling, 1891 — Brazil, Argentina
 Arachosia honesta Keyserling, 1891 — Brazil, Argentina
 Arachosia kapiipeoi Rubio & Ramírez, 2015 — Venezuela, Brazil, Ecuador, Peru, Bolivia, Chile, Argentina
 Arachosia magna Rubio & Ramírez, 2015 — Brazil, Argentina
 Arachosia minensis (Mello-Leitão, 1926) — Brazil, Argentina
 Arachosia monserrate Rubio & Ramírez, 2015 — Colombia
 Arachosia oblonga (Keyserling, 1878) — Mexico
 Arachosia pinhalito Rubio & Ramírez, 2015 — Argentina
 Arachosia praesignis (Keyserling, 1891) — Brazil, Argentina
 Arachosia proseni (Mello-Leitão, 1944) — Brazil, Argentina, Uruguay
 Arachosia puta O. Pickard-Cambridge, 1892 — Panama, Brazil
 Arachosia striata (Keyserling, 1891) — Brazil
 Arachosia tungurahua Rubio & Ramírez, 2015 — Ecuador

Araiya
Araiya Ramírez, 2003
 Araiya coccinea (Simon, 1884) — Chile, Argentina
 Araiya pallida (Tullgren, 1902) (type) — Chile, Argentina

Australaena
Australaena Berland, 1942
 Australaena hystricina Berland, 1942 (type) — French Polynesia (Austral Is.)
 Australaena zimmermani Berland, 1942 — French Polynesia (Society Is.: Tahiti)

Axyracrus
Axyracrus Simon, 1884
 Axyracrus elegans Simon, 1884 (type) — Chile, Argentina

Aysenia
Aysenia Tullgren, 1902
 Aysenia araucana Ramírez, 2003 — Chile
 Aysenia barrigai Izquierdo & Ramírez, 2008 — Chile, Argentina
 Aysenia cylindrica Ramírez, 2003 — Chile, Argentina
 Aysenia elongata Tullgren, 1902 (type) — Chile, Argentina
 Aysenia grismadoi González & Ramírez, 2012 — Chile
 Aysenia huayun González & Ramírez, 2012 — Chile
 Aysenia izquierdoi González & Ramírez, 2012 — Chile
 Aysenia paposo Laborda, Ramírez & Pizarro-Araya, 2013 — Chile
 Aysenia segestrioides Ramírez, 2003 — Chile

Aysenoides
Aysenoides Ramírez, 2003
 Aysenoides colecole Ramírez, 2003 — Chile
 Aysenoides nahuel Izquierdo & Ramírez, 2008 — Chile
 Aysenoides parvus Ramírez, 2003 — Chile, Argentina
 Aysenoides simoi Laborda, Ramírez & Pizarro-Araya, 2013 — Chile, Argentina
 Aysenoides terricola Ramírez, 2003 (type) — Chile

Aysha
Aysha Keyserling, 1891
 Aysha affinis (Blackwall, 1862) — Brazil
 Aysha albovittata Mello-Leitão, 1944 — Brazil, Argentina
 Aysha basilisca (Mello-Leitão, 1922) — Brazil
 Aysha bonaldoi Brescovit, 1992 — Brazil
 Aysha boraceia Brescovit, 1992 — Brazil
 Aysha borgmeyeri (Mello-Leitão, 1926) — Brazil, Argentina
 Aysha brevimana (C. L. Koch, 1839) — Brazil
 Aysha caxambuensis (Mello-Leitão, 1926) — Brazil, Paraguay, Argentina
 Aysha chicama Brescovit, 1992 — Brazil
 Aysha clarovittata (Keyserling, 1891) — Brazil, Argentina
 Aysha curumim Brescovit, 1992 — Brazil
 Aysha diversicolor (Keyserling, 1891) — Brazil
 Aysha ericae Brescovit, 1992 — Brazil, Argentina
 Aysha fortis (Keyserling, 1891) — Brazil
 Aysha guaiba Brescovit, 1992 — Brazil
 Aysha guarapuava Brescovit, 1992 — Brazil
 Aysha helvola (Keyserling, 1891) — Brazil
 Aysha heraldica (Mello-Leitão, 1929) — Brazil
 Aysha insulana Chickering, 1937 — Panama
 Aysha janaita Brescovit, 1992 — Brazil
 Aysha lagenifera (Mello-Leitão, 1944) — Argentina
 Aysha lisei Brescovit, 1992 — Brazil
 Aysha marinonii Brescovit, 1992 — Brazil, Paraguay, Argentina
 Aysha montenegro Brescovit, 1992 — Brazil, Argentina
 Aysha piassaguera Brescovit, 1992 — Brazil
 Aysha pirassununga Brescovit, 1992 — Brazil, Argentina
 Aysha proseni Mello-Leitão, 1944 — Brazil, Argentina
 Aysha prospera Keyserling, 1891 (type) — Bolivia, Brazil, Uruguay, Argentina
 Aysha robusta (Keyserling, 1891) — Brazil
 Aysha rubromaculata (Keyserling, 1891) — Brazil, Argentina
 Aysha strandi (Caporiacco, 1947) — Guyana
 Aysha striolata (Keyserling, 1891) — Brazil
 Aysha subruba (Keyserling, 1891) — Brazil
 Aysha taeniata (Keyserling, 1891) — Brazil
 Aysha taim Brescovit, 1992 — Brazil
 Aysha tapejara Brescovit, 1992 — Brazil
 Aysha tertulia Brescovit, 1992 — Brazil, Argentina
 Aysha triunfo Brescovit, 1992 — Brazil, Argentina
 Aysha vacaria Brescovit, 1992 — Brazil
 Aysha yacupoi Brescovit, 1992 — Brazil, Argentina
 Aysha zenzesi (Mello-Leitão, 1945) — Brazil, Argentina

B

Bromelina
Bromelina Brescovit, 1993
 Bromelina kochalkai Brescovit, 1993 — Colombia
 Bromelina oliola Brescovit, 1993 (type) — Brazil
 Bromelina zuniala Brescovit, 1993 — Venezuela

Buckupiella
Buckupiella Brescovit, 1997
 Buckupiella imperatriz Brescovit, 1997 (type) — Brazil, Argentina

C

Coptoprepes
Coptoprepes Simon, 1884
 Coptoprepes bellavista Werenkraut & Ramírez, 2009 — Chile
 Coptoprepes campanensis Ramírez, 2003 — Chile
 Coptoprepes casablanca Werenkraut & Ramírez, 2009 — Chile, Argentina
 Coptoprepes contulmo Werenkraut & Ramírez, 2009 — Chile
 Coptoprepes ecotono Werenkraut & Ramírez, 2009 — Chile, Argentina
 Coptoprepes eden Werenkraut & Ramírez, 2009 — Chile
 Coptoprepes flavopilosus Simon, 1884 (type) — Chile, Argentina
 Coptoprepes laudani Barone, Werenkraut  & Ramírez, 2016 — Chile, Argentina
 Coptoprepes nahuelbuta Ramírez, 2003 — Chile
 Coptoprepes recinto Werenkraut & Ramírez, 2009 — Chile
 Coptoprepes valdiviensis Ramírez, 2003 — Chile, Argentina
 Coptoprepes variegatus Mello-Leitão, 1940 — Argentina

F

Ferrieria
Ferrieria Tullgren, 1901
 Ferrieria echinata Tullgren, 1901 (type) — Chile, Argentina

G

Gamakia
Gamakia Ramírez, 2003
 Gamakia hirsuta Ramírez, 2003 (type) — Chile

Gayenna
Gayenna Nicolet, 1849
 Gayenna americana Nicolet, 1849 (type) — Chile, Argentina
 Gayenna brasiliensis Roewer, 1951 — Brazil
 Gayenna chrysophila Mello-Leitão, 1926 — Brazil
 Gayenna furcata (Keyserling, 1879) — Peru
 Gayenna ignava Banks, 1898 — Mexico
 Gayenna moreirae (Mello-Leitão, 1915) — Brazil
 Gayenna orizaba Banks, 1898 — Mexico
 Gayenna sigillum Mello-Leitão, 1941 — Argentina
 Gayenna trivittata (Bertkau, 1880) — Brazil
 Gayenna vittata (Keyserling, 1881) — Peru

Gayennoides
Gayennoides Ramírez, 2003
 Gayennoides losvilos Ramírez, 2003 — Chile
 Gayennoides molles Ramírez, 2003 (type) — Chile

H

Hatitia
Hatitia Brescovit, 1997
 Hatitia canchaque Brescovit, 1997 — Ecuador, Peru
 Hatitia defonlonguei (Berland, 1913) — Ecuador
 Hatitia perrieri (Berland, 1913) — Ecuador
 Hatitia riveti (Berland, 1913) — Ecuador
 Hatitia sericea (L. Koch, 1866) — Colombia
 Hatitia yhuaia Brescovit, 1997 (type) — Peru

Hibana

Hibana Brescovit, 1991
 Hibana arunda (Platnick, 1974) — USA, Mexico
 Hibana banksi (Strand, 1906) — USA
 Hibana bicolor (Banks, 1909) — Costa Rica, Colombia
 Hibana cambridgei (Bryant, 1931) — USA, Mexico
 Hibana discolor (Mello-Leitão, 1929) — Brazil, Bolivia
 Hibana flavescens (Schmidt, 1971) — Colombia
 Hibana fusca (Franganillo, 1926) — Cuba
 Hibana futilis (Banks, 1898) — USA to Venezuela, Cuba
 Hibana gracilis (Hentz, 1847) (type) — USA, Canada
 Hibana incursa (Chamberlin, 1919) — USA to Panama
 Hibana longipalpa (Bryant, 1931) — El Salvador, Nicaragua, Costa Rica
 Hibana melloleitaoi (Caporiacco, 1947) — Mexico to Brazil
 Hibana similaris (Banks, 1929) — Mexico to Brazil
 Hibana taboga Brescovit, 1991 — Panama
 Hibana talmina Brescovit, 1993 — Dominican Rep., Trinidad, northern South America
 Hibana tenuis (L. Koch, 1866) — Mexico to Venezuela, Caribbean
 Hibana turquinensis (Bryant, 1940) — Cuba
 Hibana velox (Becker, 1879) — USA, Mexico, Caribbean

I

Iguarima
Iguarima Brescovit, 1997
 Iguarima censoria (Keyserling, 1891) (type) — Brazil
 Iguarima pichincha Brescovit, 1997 — Ecuador

Ilocomba
Ilocomba Brescovit, 1997
 Ilocomba marta Brescovit, 1997 (type) — Colombia
 Ilocomba perija Brescovit, 1997 — Colombia

Isigonia
Isigonia Simon, 1897
 Isigonia camacan Brescovit, 1991 — Brazil
 Isigonia limbata Simon, 1897 (type) — Venezuela, Peru, Brazil
 Isigonia reducta (Chickering, 1940) — Panama

Italaman
Italaman Brescovit, 1997
 Italaman santamaria Brescovit, 1997 (type) — Colombia, Brazil, Argentina

J

Jessica
Jessica Brescovit, 1997
 Jessica campesina (Bauab, 1979) — Brazil
 Jessica eden Brescovit, 1999 — Venezuela
 Jessica erythrostoma (Mello-Leitão, 1939) — Colombia to Argentina
 Jessica fidelis (Mello-Leitão, 1922) — Brazil, Bolivia, Paraguay, Argentina
 Jessica glabra (Keyserling, 1891) — Brazil, Paraguay, Argentina
 Jessica itatiaia Brescovit, 1999 — Brazil
 Jessica osoriana (Mello-Leitão, 1922) (type) — Brazil, Paraguay, Argentina
 Jessica pachecoi Brescovit, 1999 — Brazil
 Jessica puava Brescovit, 1999 — Brazil
 Jessica rafaeli Brescovit, 1999 — Brazil
 Jessica renneri Brescovit, 1999 — Brazil
 Jessica sergipana Brescovit, 1999 — Brazil

Josa
Josa Keyserling, 1891
 Josa analis (Simon, 1897) — Venezuela
 Josa andesiana (Berland, 1913) — Ecuador
 Josa bryantae (Caporiacco, 1955) — Venezuela
 Josa calilegua Ramírez, 2003 — Argentina
 Josa chazaliae (Simon, 1897) — Colombia
 Josa gounellei (Simon, 1897) — Brazil
 Josa keyserlingi (L. Koch, 1866) — Colombia, Brazil
 Josa laeta (O. Pickard-Cambridge, 1896) — Costa Rica
 Josa lojensis (Berland, 1913) — Ecuador
 Josa lutea (Keyserling, 1878) (type) — Colombia, Ecuador
 Josa maura (Simon, 1897) — Venezuela
 Josa nigrifrons (Simon, 1897) — Mexico to Bolivia
 Josa personata (Simon, 1897) — Ecuador
 Josa riveti (Berland, 1913) — Ecuador, Bolivia
 Josa simoni (Berland, 1913) — Ecuador

K

Katissa
Katissa Brescovit, 1997
 Katissa delicatula (Banks, 1909) — Costa Rica
 Katissa elegans (Banks, 1909) — Costa Rica
 Katissa guyasamini Dupérré & Tapia, 2016 — Ecuador
 Katissa kurusiki Dupérré & Tapia, 2016 — Ecuador
 Katissa lycosoides (Chickering, 1937) — Panama
 Katissa puyu Dupérré & Tapia, 2016 — Ecuador
 Katissa simplicipalpis (Simon, 1898) (type) — Lesser Antilles, Panama, Peru
 Katissa tamya Dupérré & Tapia, 2016 — Ecuador
 Katissa yaya Dupérré & Tapia, 2016 — Ecuador
 Katissa zimarae (Reimoser, 1939) — Costa Rica

L

Lepajan
Lepajan Brescovit, 1993
 Lepajan edwardsi Brescovit, 1997 — Ecuador
 Lepajan montanus (Chickering, 1940) (type) — Panama

Lupettiana
Lupettiana Brescovit, 1997
 Lupettiana bimini Brescovit, 1999 — Bahama Is.
 Lupettiana eberhardi Brescovit, 1999 — Costa Rica
 Lupettiana levii Brescovit, 1999 — Hispaniola
 Lupettiana linguanea Brescovit, 1997 (type) — Jamaica, Guadeloupe, Dominica
 Lupettiana manauara Brescovit, 1999 — Brazil
 Lupettiana mordax (O. Pickard-Cambridge, 1896) — USA to Peru, Brazil
 Lupettiana parvula (Banks, 1903) — Cuba, Hispaniola
 Lupettiana piedra Brescovit, 1999 — Cuba
 Lupettiana spinosa (Bryant, 1948) — Hispaniola

M

Macrophyes
Macrophyes O. Pickard-Cambridge, 1893
 Macrophyes attenuata O. Pickard-Cambridge, 1893 (type) — Mexico
 Macrophyes elongata Chickering, 1937 — Costa Rica, Panama
 Macrophyes jundiai Brescovit, 1993 — Brazil, Argentina
 Macrophyes manati Brescovit, 1993 — Peru
 Macrophyes silvae Brescovit, 1992 — Peru

Mesilla
Mesilla Simon, 1903
 Mesilla anyphaenoides Caporiacco, 1954 — French Guiana
 Mesilla vittiventris Simon, 1903 (type) — Colombia, Ecuador

Monapia
Monapia Simon, 1897
 Monapia alupuran Ramírez, 1995 — Chile
 Monapia angusta (Mello-Leitão, 1944) — Uruguay, Argentina
 Monapia carolina Ramírez, 1999 — Argentina
 Monapia charrua Ramírez, 1999 — Uruguay, Argentina
 Monapia dilaticollis (Nicolet, 1849) (type) — Chile, Argentina, Juan Fernandez Is.
 Monapia fierro Ramírez, 1999 — Argentina
 Monapia guenoana Ramírez, 1999 — Uruguay, Argentina
 Monapia huaria Ramírez, 1995 — Chile
 Monapia lutea (Nicolet, 1849) — Chile, Argentina
 Monapia pichinahuel Ramírez, 1995 — Chile, Argentina
 Monapia silvatica Ramírez, 1995 — Chile, Argentina
 Monapia tandil Ramírez, 1999 — Argentina
 Monapia vittata (Simon, 1884) — Chile, Argentina

N

Negayan
Negayan Ramírez, 2003
 Negayan ancha Lopardo, 2005 — Chile, Argentina
 Negayan argentina Lopardo, 2005 — Argentina
 Negayan cerronegro Lopardo, 2005 — Argentina
 Negayan coccinea (Mello-Leitão, 1943) — Argentina
 Negayan enrollada Lopardo, 2005 — Chile, Argentina
 Negayan excepta (Tullgren, 1901) — Chile, Argentina
 Negayan paduana (Karsch, 1880) — Chile, Argentina, Falkland Is.
 Negayan puno Lopardo, 2005 — Peru, Argentina
 Negayan tarapaca Lopardo, 2005 — Peru, Chile
 Negayan tata Lopardo, 2005 — Chile, Argentina
 Negayan tridentata (Simon, 1886) (type) — Argentina
 Negayan tucuman Lopardo, 2005 — Argentina

O

Osoriella
Osoriella Mello-Leitão, 1922
 Osoriella domingos Brescovit, 1998 — Brazil
 Osoriella pallidoemanu Mello-Leitão, 1926 — Brazil
 Osoriella rubella (Keyserling, 1891) (type) — Brazil
 Osoriella tahela Brescovit, 1998 — Peru, Brazil, Bolivia, Paraguay, Argentina

Otoniela
Otoniela Brescovit, 1997
 Otoniela adisi Brescovit, 1997 (type) — Peru, Brazil
 Otoniela quadrivittata (Simon, 1897) — Venezuela, Argentina

Oxysoma
Oxysoma Nicolet, 1849
 Oxysoma chiloensis (Ramírez, 2003) — Chile, Argentina
 Oxysoma itambezinho Ramírez, 2003 — Brazil
 Oxysoma kuni Aisen & Ramírez, 2015 — Chile
 Oxysoma longiventre (Nicolet, 1849) — Chile, Argentina
 Oxysoma losruiles Aisen & Ramírez, 2015 — Chile
 Oxysoma macrocuspis Aisen & Ramírez, 2015 — Chile
 Oxysoma punctatum Nicolet, 1849 (type) — Chile, Argentina
 Oxysoma saccatum (Tullgren, 1902) — Chile, Argentina

P

Patrera
Patrera Simon, 1903
 Patrera apora (Chamberlin, 1916) — Peru
 Patrera armata (Chickering, 1940) — Panama, Brazil
 Patrera auricoma (L. Koch, 1866) — Colombia
 Patrera cita (Keyserling, 1891) — Brazil
 Patrera fulvastra Simon, 1903 (type) — Colombia, Ecuador
 Patrera hatunkiru Dupérré & Tapia, 2016 — Ecuador
 Patrera lauta (Chickering, 1940) — Panama
 Patrera longipes (Keyserling, 1891) — Brazil, Argentina
 Patrera philipi Dupérré & Tapia, 2016 — Ecuador
 Patrera procera (Keyserling, 1891) — Brazil, Argentina
 Patrera puta (O. Pickard-Cambridge, 1896) — Costa Rica
 Patrera ruber (F. O. Pickard-Cambridge, 1900) — Guatemala, Costa Rica, Colombia, Ecuador
 Patrera shida Dupérré & Tapia, 2016 — Ecuador
 Patrera stylifer (F. O. Pickard-Cambridge, 1900) — Panama
 Patrera suni Dupérré & Tapia, 2016 — Ecuador
 Patrera virgata (Keyserling, 1891) — Brazil
 Patrera witsu Dupérré & Tapia, 2016 — Ecuador

Phidyle
Phidyle Simon, 1880
 Phidyle punctipes (Nicolet, 1849) (type) — Chile

Philisca
Philisca Simon, 1884
 Philisca accentifera Simon, 1904 — Chile, Argentina
 Philisca amaena (Simon, 1884) — Chile, Argentina
 Philisca atrata Soto & Ramírez, 2012 — Chile, Argentina
 Philisca doilu (Ramírez, 1993) — Chile, Argentina
 Philisca hahni Simon, 1884 (type) — Chile, Argentina
 Philisca huapi Ramírez, 2003 — Chile, Argentina
 Philisca hyadesi (Simon, 1884) — Chile, Argentina
 Philisca ingens Berland, 1924 — Chile (Juan Fernandez Is.)
 Philisca ornata Berland, 1924 — Chile (Juan Fernandez Is.)
 Philisca pizarroi Soto & Ramírez, 2012 — Chile (Juan Fernandez Is.)
 Philisca robinson Soto & Ramírez, 2012 — Chile (Juan Fernandez Is.)
 Philisca robusta Soto & Ramírez, 2012 — Chile (Juan Fernandez Is.)
 Philisca tripunctata (Nicolet, 1849) — Chile, Argentina, Falkland Is.
 Philisca viernes Soto & Ramírez, 2012 — Chile (Juan Fernandez Is.)

Pippuhana
Pippuhana Brescovit, 1997
 Pippuhana calcar (Bryant, 1931) — USA
 Pippuhana donaldi (Chickering, 1940) — Panama
 Pippuhana gandu Brescovit, 1997 (type) — Brazil
 Pippuhana unicolor (Keyserling, 1891) — Brazil

R

Rathalos
Rathalos Lin & Li, 2022
 Rathalos treecko Lin & Li, 2021 — China (Hainan)
 Rathalos xiushanensis Song & Zhu, 1991 – China

S

Sanogasta
Sanogasta Mello-Leitão, 1941
 Sanogasta alticola (Simon, 1896) — Peru, Bolivia, Argentina
 Sanogasta approximata (Tullgren, 1901) — Chile, Argentina
 Sanogasta backhauseni (Simon, 1895) — Chile, Argentina, Uruguay
 Sanogasta backhauseni patagonicus (Simon, 1905) — Argentina
 Sanogasta bonariensis (Mello-Leitão, 1940) — Argentina
 Sanogasta maculatipes (Keyserling, 1878) (type) — Peru, Bolivia, Brazil, Uruguay, Argentina, Chile. Introduced to Easter Is.
 Sanogasta maculosa (Nicolet, 1849) — Chile, Argentina, Juan Fernandez Is.
 Sanogasta mandibularis Ramírez, 2003 — Argentina, Paraguay
 Sanogasta minuta (Keyserling, 1891) — Brazil, Argentina
 Sanogasta paucilineata (Mello-Leitão, 1945) — Argentina
 Sanogasta pehuenche Ramírez, 2003 — Chile, Argentina
 Sanogasta puma Ramírez, 2003 — Brazil, Uruguay, Argentina
 Sanogasta rufithorax (Tullgren, 1902) — Chile
 Sanogasta tenuis Ramírez, 2003 — Brazil, Argentina
 Sanogasta x-signata (Keyserling, 1891) — Brazil, Uruguay, Argentina

Selknamia
Selknamia Ramírez, 2003
 Selknamia minima Ramírez, 2003 (type) — Chile, Argentina

Shuyushka
Shuyushka Dupérré & Tapia, 2016
 Shuyushka achachay Dupérré & Tapia, 2016 — Ecuador
 Shuyushka moscai Dupérré & Tapia, 2016 — Ecuador
 Shuyushka wachi Dupérré & Tapia, 2016 (type) — Ecuador

Sillus
Sillus F. O. Pickard-Cambridge, 1900
 Sillus attiguus (O. Pickard-Cambridge, 1896) (type) — Mexico
 Sillus curvispina F. O. Pickard-Cambridge, 1900 — Panama
 Sillus delicatus Mello-Leitão, 1922 — Brazil
 Sillus dubius (Chickering, 1937) — Panama
 Sillus furciger Caporiacco, 1954 — French Guiana
 Sillus imbecillus (Keyserling, 1891) — Brazil
 Sillus longispina F. O. Pickard-Cambridge, 1900 — Guatemala, Costa Rica, Panama
 Sillus lunula F. O. Pickard-Cambridge, 1900 — Guatemala
 Sillus pellucidus (Keyserling, 1891) — Brazil
 Sillus ravus Chickering, 1940 — Panama

Sinophaena
Sinophaena Lin & Li, 2021
 Sinophaena bivalva Zhang & Song, 2004 — China
 Sinophaena xiweni Lin & Li, 2021 — China

T

Tafana
Tafana Simon, 1903
 Tafana quelchi (Pocock, 1895) — Venezuela
 Tafana riveti Simon, 1903 (type) — Ecuador
 Tafana silhavyi (Caporiacco, 1955) — Venezuela
 Tafana straminea (L. Koch, 1866) — Colombia

Tasata
Tasata Simon, 1903
 Tasata centralis Ramírez, 2003 — Argentina
 Tasata frenata (Mello-Leitão, 1947) — Brazil
 Tasata fuscotaeniata (Keyserling, 1891) — Brazil
 Tasata nova (Mello-Leitão, 1922) — Brazil
 Tasata parcepunctata Simon, 1903 (type) — Argentina, Uruguay
 Tasata punctata (Keyserling, 1891) — Brazil
 Tasata quinquenotata (Simon, 1897) — Brazil
 Tasata reticulata (Mello-Leitão, 1943) — Brazil
 Tasata taim Ramírez, 2003 — Brazil
 Tasata taperae (Mello-Leitão, 1929) — Brazil
 Tasata tigris Mello-Leitão, 1941 — Brazil
 Tasata tripunctata (Mello-Leitão, 1941) — Brazil
 Tasata tullgreni Roewer, 1951 — Bolivia
 Tasata unipunctata (Simon, 1897) — Brazil
 Tasata variolosa Mello-Leitão, 1943 — Brazil, Uruguay, Argentina

Temnida
Temnida Simon, 1896
 Temnida rosario Brescovit, 1997 — Brazil, Paraguay, Argentina
 Temnida simplex Simon, 1897 (type) — Venezuela

Teudis
Teudis O. Pickard-Cambridge, 1896
 Teudis angusticeps (Keyserling, 1891) — Brazil
 Teudis atrofasciatus Mello-Leitão, 1922 — Brazil
 Teudis bicornutus (Tullgren, 1905) — Bolivia
 Teudis buelowae (Mello-Leitão, 1946) — Paraguay
 Teudis cambridgei Chickering, 1940 — Panama
 Teudis comstocki (Soares & Camargo, 1948) — Brazil
 Teudis concolor (Keyserling, 1891) — Brazil
 Teudis cordobensis Mello-Leitão, 1941 — Argentina
 Teudis dichotomus Mello-Leitão, 1929 — Brazil
 Teudis fatuus (Mello-Leitão, 1942) — Brazil, Argentina
 Teudis formosus (Keyserling, 1891) — Brazil
 Teudis gastrotaeniatus Mello-Leitão, 1944 — Argentina
 Teudis geminus Petrunkevitch, 1911 (type) — Guatemala, Costa Rica, Panama, Ecuador
 Teudis griseus (Keyserling, 1891) — Brazil
 Teudis itatiayae Mello-Leitão, 1915 — Brazil
 Teudis juradoi Chickering, 1940 — Panama
 Teudis lenis (Keyserling, 1891) — Brazil
 Teudis morenus (Mello-Leitão, 1941) — Argentina
 Teudis opertaneus (Keyserling, 1891) — Brazil
 Teudis parvulus (Keyserling, 1891) — Brazil
 Teudis peragrans (O. Pickard-Cambridge, 1898) — Guatemala, Brazil
 Teudis recentissimus (Keyserling, 1891) — Brazil
 Teudis roseus F. O. Pickard-Cambridge, 1900 — Panama
 Teudis suspiciosus (Keyserling, 1891) — Brazil
 Teudis tensipes (Keyserling, 1891) — Brazil
 Teudis tensus (Keyserling, 1891) — Brazil
 Teudis ypsilon Mello-Leitão, 1922 — Brazil

Thaloe
Thaloe Brescovit, 1993
 Thaloe ennery Brescovit, 1993 — Hispaniola
 Thaloe remotus (Bryant, 1948) (type) — Hispaniola
 Thaloe tricuspis (Bryant, 1940) — Cuba

Timbuka
Timbuka Brescovit, 1997
 Timbuka bogotensis (L. Koch, 1866) — Colombia, Bolivia
 Timbuka boquete Brescovit, 1997 (type) — Costa Rica, Panama, Colombia
 Timbuka granadensis (Keyserling, 1879) — Colombia
 Timbuka larvata (O. Pickard-Cambridge, 1896) — Mexico
 Timbuka masseneti (Berland, 1913) — Ecuador
 Timbuka meridiana (L. Koch, 1866) — Colombia

Tomopisthes
Tomopisthes Simon, 1884
 Tomopisthes horrendus (Nicolet, 1849) (type) — Chile, Argentina
 Tomopisthes puconensis (Ramírez, 2003) — Chile, Argentina
 Tomopisthes pusillus (Nicolet, 1849) — Chile, Argentina
 Tomopisthes tullgreni Simon, 1905 — Argentina
 Tomopisthes varius Simon, 1884 — Chile, Argentina

U

Umuara
Umuara Brescovit, 1997
 Umuara fasciata (Blackwall, 1862) (type) — Venezuela, Brazil
 Umuara freddyi Oliveira & Brescovit, 2015 — Brazil
 Umuara junin Brescovit, 1997 — Peru
 Umuara juquia Brescovit, 1997 — Brazil
 Umuara pydanieli Brescovit, 1997 — Brazil
 Umuara xingo Oliveira & Brescovit, 2015 — Brazil

W

Wulfila

Wulfila O. Pickard-Cambridge, 1895
 Wulfila albens (Hentz, 1847) — USA
 Wulfila albus (Mello-Leitão, 1945) — Brazil, Paraguay, Argentina
 Wulfila arraijanicus Chickering, 1940 — Panama
 Wulfila bryantae Platnick, 1974 — USA, Mexico
 Wulfila coamoanus Petrunkevitch, 1930 — Puerto Rico
 Wulfila diversus O. Pickard-Cambridge, 1895 — Mexico
 Wulfila fasciculus (Bryant, 1948) — Hispaniola
 Wulfila fragilis Chickering, 1937 — Panama
 Wulfila fragilis (Bryant, 1948) — Hispaniola
 Wulfila gracilipes (Banks, 1903) — Hispaniola
 Wulfila immaculatus Banks, 1914 — USA, Cuba, Puerto Rico
 Wulfila immaculellus (Gertsch, 1933) — USA, Mexico
 Wulfila inconspicuus Petrunkevitch, 1930 — Puerto Rico
 Wulfila innoxius Chickering, 1940 — Panama
 Wulfila inornatus (O. Pickard-Cambridge, 1898) — Mexico
 Wulfila isolatus Bryant, 1942 — Puerto Rico
 Wulfila longidens Mello-Leitão, 1948 — Guyana
 Wulfila longipes (Bryant, 1940) — Cuba
 Wulfila macer (Simon, 1898) — St. Vincent
 Wulfila macropalpus Petrunkevitch, 1930 — Puerto Rico
 Wulfila maculatus Chickering, 1937 — Panama
 Wulfila mandibulatus (Petrunkevitch, 1925) — Panama
 Wulfila modestus Chickering, 1937 — Panama
 Wulfila pallidus O. Pickard-Cambridge, 1895 (type) — Mexico
 Wulfila parvulus (Banks, 1898) — Mexico
 Wulfila pavidus (Bryant, 1948) — Mexico
 Wulfila pellucidus Chickering, 1937 — Panama
 Wulfila pretiosus Banks, 1914 — Cuba
 Wulfila proximus O. Pickard-Cambridge, 1895 — Mexico
 Wulfila pulverulentus Chickering, 1937 — Panama
 Wulfila saltabundus (Hentz, 1847) — USA, Canada
 Wulfila sanguineus Franganillo, 1931 — Cuba
 Wulfila scopulatus Simon, 1897 — America
 Wulfila spatulatus F. O. Pickard-Cambridge, 1900 — Guatemala
 Wulfila spinosus Chickering, 1937 — Panama
 Wulfila sublestus Chickering, 1940 — Panama
 Wulfila tantillus Chickering, 1940 — USA to Panama
 Wulfila tauricorneus Franganillo, 1935 — Cuba
 Wulfila tenuissimus Simon, 1896 — Jamaica
 Wulfila tinctus Franganillo, 1930 — Cuba
 Wulfila tropicus Petrunkevitch, 1930 — Puerto Rico
 Wulfila ventralis Banks, 1906 — Bahama Is.
 Wulfila wunda Platnick, 1974 — USA, Cuba, Puerto Rico (Mona Is.)

Wulfilopsis
Wulfilopsis Soares & Camargo, 1955
 Wulfilopsis frenata (Keyserling, 1891) — Brazil
 Wulfilopsis leopoldina Brescovit, 1997 — Brazil
 Wulfilopsis martinsi Brescovit, 1997 — Brazil
 Wulfilopsis pygmaea (Keyserling, 1891) — Brazil
 Wulfilopsis tenuipes (Keyserling, 1891) (type) — Brazil
 Wulfilopsis tripunctata (Mello-Leitão, 1947) — Brazil

X

Xiruana
Xiruana Brescovit, 1997
 Xiruana affinis (Mello-Leitão, 1922) — Brazil
 Xiruana ajuricaba Oliveira & Brescovit, 2015 — Brazil
 Xiruana aymara Oliveira & Brescovit, 2015 — Bolivia
 Xiruana bifida Oliveira & Brescovit, 2015 — Brazil, Paraguay
 Xiruana cocha Oliveira & Brescovit, 2015 — Peru
 Xiruana fiebrigi Oliveira & Brescovit, 2015 — Paraguay
 Xiruana gracilipes (Keyserling, 1891) (type) — Brazil, Bolivia, Argentina
 Xiruana guaia Oliveira & Brescovit, 2015 — Brazil
 Xiruana hirsuta (Mello-Leitão, 1938) — Venezuela, Brazil, Paraguay, Argentina, Uruguay
 Xiruana jaboticabal Oliveira & Brescovit, 2015 — Brazil
 Xiruana lusitania Oliveira & Brescovit, 2015 — Brazil
 Xiruana minacu Oliveira & Brescovit, 2015 — Brazil
 Xiruana pocone Oliveira & Brescovit, 2015 — Brazil, Paraguay, Argentina
 Xiruana silarae Oliveira & Brescovit, 2015 — Brazil
 Xiruana tapirape Oliveira & Brescovit, 2015 — Brazil
 Xiruana tetraseta (Mello-Leitão, 1939) — Venezuela, Brazil, Paraguay
 Xiruana tribarrense Oliveira & Brescovit, 2015 — Brazil

References

Anyphaenidae
Anyphaenidae